is a railway station on the Senmō Main Line in Koshimizu, Hokkaido, Japan, operated by the Hokkaido Railway Company (JR Hokkaido).

Lines
Yamubetsu Station is served by the Senmō Main Line, and is numbered B73.

Adjacent stations

External links
 JR Hokkaido Yamubetsu Station information 

Stations of Hokkaido Railway Company
Railway stations in Hokkaido Prefecture
Railway stations in Japan opened in 1925